The 2018–19 Chennaiyin FC season was the club's fifth season since its establishment in 2014 and their fifth season in the Indian Super League. They will also play in the 2019 AFC Cup. This is the first time an ISL club will play in any continental championship.

Transfers

Pre-season

In:

Out:

Squad

Out on loan

Technical staff

Pre-season and friendlies

Chennayin FC started their pre-season in Malaysia on 14 August under the watchful eyes of John Gregory. The team is supposed to play four warm-up matches and will return to Chennai on September 11.

In the first friendly, Chennaiyin played with Malaysia U19 and drew the match. Playing against Malaysia Premier League team MIFA, Chennaiyin won in penalties by 3-2 after regulation time ended in 1-1. They played their third match against Felda United and drew that match. Chennaiyin played their last match of Malaysian sojourn against Terengganu FC and lost it 2-1.

Competitions

Indian Super League

League table

Matches

References

Chennaiyin FC seasons
Chennaiyin